Jeryn "Jeri" Hogarth  is a fictional character appearing in American comic books published by Marvel Comics. He is a friend of Iron Fist's father Wendell and an attorney for the Heroes for Hire, a team of heroes of which Iron Fist is a member.

Carrie-Anne Moss portrayed a gender-swapped version of the character in the Marvel Cinematic Universe (MCU) streaming television series Jessica Jones, Daredevil, Iron Fist, and The Defenders.

Publication history
Jeri Hogarth first appeared in Iron Fist #6 (August 1976) and was created by writer Chris Claremont and artist John Byrne.

Fictional character biography
After Wendell Rand's death, Hogarth became the executor of his estate, keeping Wendell's son Iron Fist under surveillance after his return to the states as well as hiring Misty Knight and Colleen Wing to contact him and verify that he was truly his deceased friend's son.

Initially, Heroes for Hire, Inc. was a small business licensed by the state of New York that offered a full line of professional investigation and protection services. Heroes for Hire was owned by Luke Cage and Daniel Rand. It had offices on Park Avenue and two paid employees: Jenny Royce, the group's secretary and Jeryn Hogarth, the group's lawyer and business representative. Heroes for Hire would not accept jobs that involved extralegal activities.

Jeryn asked Luke Cage and Iron Fist to escort his daughter Millie Hogarth to a debutante's ball to impress his ex-wife. Nightshade, Stiletto, Discus, Man Mountain Marko, and the Eel came to kidnap her.

During the 2006–2007 "Civil War" storyline, Hogarth opposes the Superhuman Registration Act. He stops Iron Man from arresting Iron Fist (who was posing as Daredevil at the time), stating that he is already a registered weapon in the US.

Reception
 In 2022, CBR.com ranked Jeryn Hogarth 9th in their "10 Most Powerful Lawyers In Marvel Comics" list.

In other media

Television

 A gender-swapped version of Jeri Hogarth appears in the Netflix series set in the Marvel Cinematic Universe, portrayed by Carrie-Anne Moss. She is the first openly lesbian character in the MCU. While she is a supporting or minor character in Daredevil, Iron Fist and The Defenders, she serves as a primary antagonist in each season of Jessica Jones.
 Jeri first appears in Jessica Jones. In the first season, she is a senior partner at the Manhattan law firm of Hogarth, Chao & Benowitz, and a recurring client of Jessica Jones. Her relationship with Jessica leads Jeri to become involved with Kilgrave when Jessica presses her into defending Hope Schlottman, a college student that Kilgrave ordered to kill her parents. At the time for these events Jeri is going through a bitter divorce with her wife, local doctor Wendy, while having an affair with her own secretary Pam. Jeri hires Jessica to dig up dirt on Wendy who in turn is trying to blackmail Jeri with evidence of past ethical violations. When Jessica fails to deliver in a timely fashion due to preoccupation with hunting Kilgrave, Jeri tries to have Kilgrave coerce Wendy into signing the divorce papers, freeing him from his cell. Instead, Kilgrave betrays Jeri and orders Wendy to give Jeri a literal death by a thousand cuts. Pam intervenes, accidentally killing Wendy and proceeds to break up with Jeri on account of her use of Kilgrave. After Jessica kills Kilgrave, Jeri represents her while she's being questioned by the police, convincing them to let her go. 
 Jeri appears in the second season of Daredevil. Early in the season, it is mentioned that Jeri hired Foggy Nelson's girlfriend Marci Stahl after Landman & Zack's managing partners were arrested for aiding and abetting Wilson Fisk. In the episode finale "A Cold Day In Hell's Kitchen", Jeri approaches Foggy and offers him a job at Hogarth Chao & Benowitz, having been very impressed by Foggy's defense of Frank Castle. Matt Murdock persuades Foggy to take Hogarth's offer as a way to move on.
 Jeri appears in the first season of Iron Fist. It is revealed that before starting Hogarth Chao & Benowitz, she interned in the legal department at Rand Enterprises, where she held a distrust for Harold Meachum. Danny nicknamed her "J-Money", and also recounts that she once bribed him $5 to keep quiet after he overheard her throwing a profane rant at his father's secretary. After Harold killed Danny's parents in a staged plane crash, Jeri took care of the Rand family's graves and cared for their estate. Soon after his return to New York City, Danny seeks out Jeri. She offers to help him prove his identity and takes his case pro bono out of respect for his father - on the condition he put her law firm on permanent retainer with Rand Enterprises if they succeed in arbitration with Ward and Joy Meachum. Jeri attends a press conference staged by Ward (on Harold's advice) to announce Danny's return to the public. She later arranges for paperwork to be sent to Danny for him to sign. After Harold frames Danny for the Hand's drug smuggling, Ward reaches out to Jeri to help clear Danny's name. She is surprised to see Harold alive, and spinning a false story about gene therapy and cryogenics. Claire Temple is later sent by Danny and Colleen to summon Jeri to a rendezvous with Danny and Collen, where she informs them about the charges against them and suggests that they prove their innocence. Following Harold's death, Jeri is present with Danny and Ward when they have Harold's body cremated so that he can't be brought back to life.
 Jeri appears in The Defenders. In the episode "Mean Right Hook", Jeri tracks down Jessica and urges her to exercise caution after Jessica's investigation into a man named John Raymond uncovers a stockpiled cache of explosives, causing increased police attention. Still not trusting Jessica, Jeri tasks Foggy with keeping an eye on Jessica, unaware that Foggy then proceeds to pass this task off to Matt.
In the second season of Jessica Jones, Jeri somehow avoids prison for her involvement with Kilgrave and her role in Wendy's murder, but is diagnosed with Amyotrophic lateral sclerosis and learns that she has up to eight years to live. Her partners, Linda Chao and Steven Benowitz, try to invoke a medical clause in her contract to force her out of the firm. In the midst of dealing with conflict between Jessica and rival private investigator Pryce Cheng, Jeri hires Jessica to find dirt on Chao and Benowitz. Due to Jessica being busy investigating IGH with Trish, Malcolm is the one tasked with handling Jeri's case. Jeri later puts up and seduces Inez Green, a homeless IGH nurse found by Jessica and Trish, and protects her. However, Inez turns out to be a con artist, and swindles Jeri into getting her boyfriend Shane out of jail claiming that he was an IGH patient who could heal people by touch, after which Inez and Shane loot Jeri's apartment and flee. Enraged by the deception, Jeri acquires a gun from Turk Barrett, locates and manipulates Inez into murdering Shane, and calls the police to arrest Inez. With nothing to lose, Jeri is able to blackmail Chao and Benowitz into giving her a larger buyout by playing them a hidden camera recording of a lunch meeting Malcolm had with Chao in which Chao admits to laundering drug money into offshore bank accounts. With that, Jeri leaves HC&B and opens her own firm under the name Jeryn Hogarth & Associates, bringing Foggy and Marci along with her, with Malcolm and Cheng as her fulltime investigators. 
In the third season, Jeri again avoids prison despite her role in Shane's murder, but her ALS worsens to the point that she briefly becomes suicidal, asking Jessica to kill her, but she changes her mind. When Trish Walker begins acting as the masked vigilante Hellcat and targets serial killer Gregory Sallinger, Jeri offers a bounty on Trish's head, as Sallinger is one of her clients. She reconnects with an old flame, Kith Lyonne, who she cheated on with Wendy but never stopped loving and who is now married to Peter Lyonne. Jeri seduces Kith into an affair, but Kith reveals that she and Peter are in an open marriage since their daughter's death and Peter is also having affairs. When Kith refuses to leave Peter, Jeri retaliates by discovering evidence of Peter's fraudulent activities and releasing them, resulting in Peter committing suicide while revealing on a video that Jeri is involved with superpowered people. Kith initially blames Jeri for tearing her family apart for selfish reasons, but soon turns to her for legal advice when one of her former business partners threatens to send Kith to prison for Peter's fraud. In desperation, Jeri asks Trish to find leverage on the partner, promising not to reveal her identity in the process. Trish, however, believes that Jeri asked her to kill the partner, and turns on Jeri instead, holding Kith hostage. Jessica intervenes in the ensuing confrontation, but Jeri begs Trish to release Kith, promising to get her out of the country while shooting Jessica in the leg. After Jessica tracks down and defeats Trish, Jeri tries to reconcile with Kith, but her ALS symptoms show even more to the point that her hands begin shaking, forcing Jeri to confess that she is dying. Kith subsequently discovers that Jeri only sabotaged her marriage with Peter, ruined her family and seduced her only so that she would have company during her final years, regardless of the impact it would have on Kith. Finally realizing how selfish and evil Jeri truly is, Kith abandons her to die alone.

References

External links
 Jeryn Hogarth on IMDb

Atheism in television
Characters created by John Byrne (comics)
Characters created by Chris Claremont
Comics characters introduced in 1976
Fictional lawyers
Fictional lesbians
Iron Fist (comics)